John Jowitt is a British bass guitarist known for his work with several British neo-progressive rock bands, such as Ark, IQ, Arena, Jadis and Frost*, as well as substituting for Trevor Bolder in Uriah Heep in 2013. He has been awarded the British Classic Rock Society's award for best bass player 17 times, each year between 1993 and 1998, and again between 2002 and 2011, but has now specifically asked to sponsor the award in 2013 and not be considered.

References

1961 births
Living people
British rock bass guitarists
Arena (band) members
Frost* members
IQ (band) members